Bernardo Carrillo (1874 - ?) was a Cuban baseball infielder and pitcher in the Cuban League and Negro leagues. 

Carillo played in the Cuban League from 1899 to 1909 with several teams, including Almendares, Club Fé, and Habana. He played in the Negro leagues for the All Cubans in 1899 and 1904, and for the Cuban Stars in 1907.

References

External links

1874 births
Club Fé players
Almendares (baseball) players
Cuban Stars (West) players
Habana players
Eminencia players
San Francisco (baseball) players
Cuban baseball players
Cuban League players
Year of death unknown